Tympanuchus is a small genus of birds in the grouse family. They are commonly referred to as prairie chickens.

Taxonomy
The genus Tympanuchus was introduced in 1841 by the German zoologist Constantin Wilhelm Lambert Gloger for the greater prairie chicken. The name combines the Ancient Greek tumpanon meaning "kettle-drum" with ēkheō meaning "to sound".

The genus contains three species:

All three are among the smaller grouse, from 40 to 43 cm (16 to 17 in) in length.  They are found in North America in different types of prairie. In courtship display on leks, males make hooting sounds and dance with the head extended straight forward, the tail up, and colorful neck sacks inflated (shown in the photograph at upper right). Tympanuchus comes from Ancient Greek roots and means "holding a drum"; it refers to the membranous neck sacks and the drum-like call of the greater prairie chicken. 

The two prairie chickens are particularly closely related and look extremely similar. But their taxonomy and the evolutionary relationships of the Tympanuchus is still yet to be discover. There are still unknown information about these genus. But one thing we do know is that Tympanuchus are polyphyletic. They have a strong sexual selection (Galla, 2013).

They are commonly seen in the North American Prairies (Galla, 2013).

The extinct heath hen of the American East Coast, usually considered a subspecies of the greater prairie chicken, has been considered a separate species.

References

 Galla, S. J. (2013). Exploring the evolutionary history of north american prairie grouse using multi-locus coalescent analyses (Order No. 1524962). 
 
 Peterson, Alan P. (Editor). 1999. Zoological Nomenclature Resource (Zoonomen). Accessed 2007-07-29.
 
 

 
Bird genera